Laingkat is an extinct town in Decatur County, in the U.S. state of Georgia. The GNIS classifies it as a populated place.  A variant name is "Land Cat".

History
The community was named after Langkat, in the Indonesian province of North Sumatra, the origin of a type of tobacco grown locally in Georgia.

References

Geography of Decatur County, Georgia
Ghost towns in Georgia (U.S. state)